Club Sports da Madeira  is a women's handball club from Funchal in Portugal. CS Madeira competes in the 1ª Divisão.

European record

Team

Current squad 

Squad for the 2016–17 season

Goalkeepers
 Nance Gouveia Fernandes
 Márcia Rodrigues Teixeira 
 Maria Saldanha Mendonça
 Nádia Silva Nunes

Wingers
RW
  Catarina Côrte Ascensão
  Odete de Freitas
  Maria Kourdoulos
LW 
  Sara Rodrigues Gonçalves
  Bárbara Santos Gomes
Line players 
  Sandra Martins Gonçalves
  Catarina Ribeiro Fernandes

Back players
LB
  Maria Abreu Leça
  Ana Silva Cardoso
  Ana Sousa Pestana
CB 
  Jéssica Andrade Gouveia
  Mónica Mendonça Gomes 
  Leonor Rosário Abreu 
  Lisandra Vieira Almeida 
  Ana Vieira Franco 
RB
  Beatriz Faria Sousa
  Ana Sofia Gouveia Araújo
  Cláudia Vieira

External links
 
 EHF Club profile

Sport in Madeira
Multi-sport clubs in Portugal
1909 establishments in Portugal
Portuguese handball clubs